Alexis Saïtta (born 29 June 1980) is a French lightweight rower. He won a gold medal at the 2004 World Rowing Championships in Banyoles with the lightweight men's eight.

References

1980 births
Living people
French male rowers
World Rowing Championships medalists for France